Dead Man's Float  is a 1980 Australian film about young kids who uncover smugglers.

References

External links

Australian drama television films
1980 films
Australian crime drama films
1980s English-language films